Thomas Street is a street in The Liberties in central Dublin, Ireland.

History

The street is named after the church of St. Thomas, founded in 1175 near St. Catherine's church. The founder was William FitzAldelm, deputy and kinsman of King Henry II. The church was dedicated to Thomas Beckett (St. Thomas the Martyr), who had recently been murdered in his cathedral at Canterbury by followers of the king. The church became a rich and powerful monastery, which controlled the Liberty of Thomas Court and Donore. In 1539 it was dissolved with all the monasteries by Henry VIII. Over the following 150 years the churches in the neighbourhood passed over to the reformed church, while Roman Catholic priests led a precarious existence tending to the larger part of the population, which remained faithful to the old religion.

From the mid-16th century the Lord of this Liberty was the Earl of Meath, whose family acquired the lands of the monastery from Henry VIII when he dissolved the monasteries.

In 1803 this street was the scene of the events surrounding the insurrection organised by Robert Emmet, where Lord Kilwarden was killed. Many of the participants in what turned out to be a riot were from this street and neighbouring streets.

Location

The street runs from Cornmarket to the Saint James's Gate Brewery, where Guinness is brewed; there Thomas Street connects with James's Street.

The National College of Art and Design is located on Thomas Street, as is John's Lane Church, which has the highest steeple in the city, Vicar Street (music venue), Michelin-starred restaurant Variety Jones, St. Catherine's church where the patriot Robert Emmet was executed, as well as The Thomas House bar and venue.

Thomas Street is one of only four streets in Dublin where street trading is permitted (the other three being Wexford Street, Henry Street, and Moore Street).

Notable persons
Patrick Lynch (1916), living at number 29 of Thomas Street, he was a participant in the Easter Rising. Considered a veteran of Easter Week 1916.
Dominic Corrigan (1802-1880), a prominent physician, was born in Thomas St., where his father had a shop selling farm tools. He was known for his original observations in heart disease.
James Whitelaw (1749-1813), historian and statistician, was clergyman in St. Catherine's, Thomas St., when he died of a fever contracted while visiting afflicted parishioners.
William John Fitzpatrick (31 August 1830 – 24 December 1895) was an Irish historian born on Thomas Street.

Fire Brigade
In 1907, it was planned to build a fire station on Thomas Street, to replace the makeshift station already at Winetavern Street, a proposal that had been on the table since 1898.  In 1909, some city councillors moved to shelve the plans, proposing that the money be spent on paying off the Dublin Corporation's loans instead.  However this motion failed to garner enough votes to pass, after a lengthy debate, and in November 1909 building of the station was finally given the go-ahead. The building was renovated in 2008 and became part of the National College of Art and Design.

References

Further reading 

 

Streets in Dublin (city)
History of Dublin (city)